In Greek mythology, Acallaris (Ancient Greek: Ἀκαλλαρίς) was the daughter of Eumedes. According to some accounts she married the Trojan king, Tros of whom she had a son Assaracus, also a king of Troy. Some writers gave the name Callirrhoe, daughter of the river god Scamander as the wife of Tros and became the mother of his sons. Other possible children of Tros and Acallaris are Ilus, Ganymede, Cleopatra and Cleomestra.

Family 
The writer Dionysius of Halicarnassus, wrote a passage about Acallaris' descendants as the wife of Tros:

 "of Tros and Acallaris, the daughter of Eumedes, Assaracus; of Assaracus and Clytodora, the daughter of Laomedon, Capys; of Capys and a Naiad nymph, Hieromnemê, Anchises; of Anchises and Aphroditê, Aeneas."

Genealogical tree

Notes

References 

 Dictys Cretensis, from The Trojan War. The Chronicles of Dictys of Crete and Dares the Phrygian translated by Richard McIlwaine Frazer, Jr. (1931-). Indiana University Press. 1966. Online version at the Topos Text Project.
Dionysus of Halicarnassus, Roman Antiquities. English translation by Earnest Cary in the Loeb Classical Library, 7 volumes. Harvard University Press, 1937-1950. Online version at Bill Thayer's Web Site
Dionysius of Halicarnassus, Antiquitatum Romanarum quae supersunt, Vol I-IV. . Karl Jacoby. In Aedibus B.G. Teubneri. Leipzig. 1885. Greek text available at the Perseus Digital Library.
 Pseudo-Apollodorus, The Library with an English Translation by Sir James George Frazer, F.B.A., F.R.S. in 2 Volumes, Cambridge, MA, Harvard University Press; London, William Heinemann Ltd. 1921. Online version at the Perseus Digital Library.

Queens in Greek mythology